The Most Beautiful Day in the World is a 2019 Italian fantasy comedy film directed by Alessandro Siani.

Cast

References

External links

2019 films
2010s Italian-language films
2019 comedy films
Italian fantasy comedy films
2010s fantasy comedy films
Films directed by Alessandro Siani
2010s Italian films